Cosmosoma flavicornis is a moth in the family Erebidae. Described by Herbert Druce in 1883, it is endemic to Ecuador.

References

flavicornis
Moths described in 1883